A disaster area is a region or a locale that has been heavily damaged by either natural, technological or social hazards. Disaster areas affect the population living in the community by dramatic increase in expense, loss of energy, food and services; and finally increase the risk of disease for citizens. An area that has been struck with a natural, technological or sociological hazard that opens the affected area for national or international aid.

Natural hazard
A natural hazard is a negative process of phenomena created naturally (tornadoes, hurricanes, tsunamis, floods, earthquakes) that will affect people or the environment.

Tornadoes
Tornadoes are narrow, aggressively rotating columns of air that come from the base of a thunderstorm, and are the most violent of storms. Tornadoes are usually hard to see unless they form a condensations funnel, or loft a significant amount of dust and debris. Tornadoes take place in several parts of the world, such as Australia, Europe, Africa but mostly occur in the United States, Argentina, and Bangladesh.

Tropical cyclones

Tropical cyclones are large-scale storm systems that rotate counter-clockwise in the northern hemisphere and clockwise in the southern hemisphere. They usually initiate over tropical or subtropical waters. Strong tropical cyclones (with winds exceeding 74 mph) are known as hurricanes or typhoons. Hurricanes bring rain, strong winds, and occasionally tornadoes. Hurricanes can be predicted several days before they hit, and can be very destructive, destroying buildings and causing significant flooding over wide areas. A recent (2012) example of a hurricane is Hurricane Sandy, which was the most devastating storm in decades hitting the United States, leaving millions without power and a few homeless.

Floods
Floods take place when water overflows or submerges land that is usually parched. The most common way is when rivers or streams overflow their banks. A floodplain is produced when water from a river spreads through the land from excessive rain, rapid ice melting, unfortunately placed beaver dam, and ruptured dam. There are two types of floods: general and flash floods. General floods are predicted well in advance and usually cause the destruction of housing, people and crops. Flash floods come without warning and are sudden and extreme: A large volume of water flows rapidly and people have to make quick movements if they do not want to be caught in the flood. They have to find high safe ground where the water will not reach them.

Earthquakes
When two blocks of the earth suddenly slip past each other in the fault of the earth, it is called an earthquake. Energy released in many forms moves in all directions and causes the ground to shake. Sometimes earthquakes may have foreshocks, which are smaller earthquakes that occur in the same region which is followed by a larger earthquake. The larger earthquake, called the mainshock, always has aftershocks that follow it. Aftershocks can continue of hours, weeks, months and sometimes even years depending on how big the mainshock was. Earthquakes usually occur on active faults which define major tectonic plates on the Earth. 90% of the world's earthquakes occur along plate boundaries. Earthquakes can cause much damage, mainly from the ground shaking and leaving cracks in the ground. Sometimes it can also cause buildings to collapse and cause deaths.

Technological hazards

Technical hazards

There are several technical hazards one should be aware of as they pose a threat humans and their values. These hazards are measured in terms of the risk they pose to the community using them. Technical hazards are classified by a source, specifically speaking; they can fall under automotive emissions, medical radiation, explosions and air pollution (environmental) hazards. The quality of the hazard determines the safety precautions that are taken. For example, hazards can be a risk to an individual or a risk to the population. If the population is at risk with the hazard, there will be more priorities for the management of the hazardous material. These hazardous materials can cause illness or even death to an individual if they are not address accordingly, so it is crucial for them to inform the public about these technical hazards.

Nuclear and radiation (accidents/incidents)
There are several thoughts that come to mind when one thinks of the word “nuclear”, whether it be basic chemistry or highly complex explosives; nuclear accidents, nuclear incidences or nuclear terrorism are definitely a threat to the community or the world in that matter. But what is nuclear terrorism exactly? A "nuclear accident, incident, or act of terrorism is an unpredictable, unusual and unwanted event involving radiation and/or radioactive materials." To specifically distinguish between the three, nuclear accidents are not deliberate and viewed as acts of nature. Nuclear incidents on the other hand are causes that include deliberate actions but these are “generally non-malicious and non-violent; may be due to poor judgement [or] wrong information.”

Nuclear accident
Nuclear accidents are not deliberate and viewed as acts of nature. There are several examples of these nuclear accidents taken place around the world. To start off, a prime example of a nuclear accident would be Palo mares B-52 Accident. On January 17, 1966, a U.S. Air Force B-52 bomber collided with a mid-tanker airplane that was being refueled at 31000 feet. When the two airplanes collided, the tanker airplane exploded completely killing all crew members, while the B-52 bomber split in half killing a small proportion of the crew. When the airplane split in half, four bombs dropped from the sky. Two of them detonated, causing 2 kilometers of land to be contaminated by radioactive plutonium. The fourth explosive was recovered when it was discovered that it landed on the sea. The soil on the contaminated area had to be removed and placed in barrels, to reduce the amount of pollution having been caused by the nuclear explosive.

Nuclear incident
Nuclear incidents are causes that include deliberate actions but these are “generally non-malicious and non-violent; may be due to poor judgement [or] wrong information.”  A Secondary example would be the Johnston Atoll Incident that occurred on July 25, 1962. They decided to conduct the experiment at Christmas Island on Johnson Atoll, where they set off 36 nuclear explosions. One of the missile launches went wrong as it malfunctioned when trying to launch. The leaders decided to detonate the missile before it launched. When it detonated, the entire island was covered with radioactive plutonium. The witnesses claimed that 85% of the people suffered from radioactive contamination that created cancer and other radioactive related diseases. Plus those who were present at the site of the explosion suffered from infertility, and other body deformations.

Sociological hazards
Sociological hazards that create a disaster area are riots, terrorism, and war.

Riot
A riot is defined as a noisy, violent public disturbance caused by  a group or a crowd (three or more people) usually protesting against another group or government policy in the streets. The UK London riot in August 2011, for example, was started due to the shooting of Mark Duggan by the London police. The rioters came together destroying neighbourhoods and streets violently damaging property to protest the police's actions that happened a few days prior. Riots increase expenses to repair costly damages putting the city in distress.

Terrorism

Terrorism is defined as acts of violence and threats by a group against people or property with the intention of intimidating or coercing societies or governments, often for ideological or political reasons. Terrorism occurs with an unexpected attack on non-combatants to create fear and panic having a detrimental consequence. Terrorist attacks create a massive, costly impact on the society. Not only is there large amount of property damage that may not be able to be repaired, there is also a large impact on citizens. People lose loved ones and suffer from their own health being impacted. The 9/11 terrorist attack on the twin towers in New York City marks one of the largest attacks on the United States. The Twin Towers were completely destroyed, damaging the surrounding buildings as well as causing the loss of many lives. People suffered from health problems from inhaling the sediments from the crumbling towers. The financial and social impact is still present thirteen years later in today's society. It is concluded that New York City still suffers from a post-disaster decline in financial services. New York City is a Disaster area due to the sociological hazard of terrorism.

War
War defined as a period where conflict is carried out as an act of hostility by armed forces between two or more nations or within a nation. Afghanistan, for example would be a sociological hazard causing disaster areas because it is considered a war zone. There has been an ongoing battle between United States and the Taliban in Afghanistan resulting in a war zone. Constant bombing and shooting marks up Afghanistan destructing property, land and causing threats to the civilians living in the area. Thousands have died and international aid for the cost of the war is implemented through tax payers. There is lack of resources due to the war area cutting off access to areas because of violence and danger.

Examples of modern disaster areas
An example of a technological disaster was the Fukushima disaster which was caused by a “massive 8.9-magnitude earthquake [that] hit northeast Japan”. This earthquake caused several hydrogen explosions at a power plant; five reactors were damaged, causing the plant to go into an emergency state. All this occurred because there was a technological error in the system that cut down the regular and emergency power, causing the five reactors to lose cooling capabilities and explode due to a buildup of hydrogen in the roof. This significant nuclear event had a mild impact on the public health, as the area suffered nuclear contamination. The contamination caused all the crops such as milk, water or vegetables unsafe to eat, although any increase in cancer rates are expected to be too small to detect. Hence all food grown in that area was banned from being sold. People in the “surroundings were moved to safe shelters,” and 3 people were affected by the radiation alone. The “Japanese government [handled] the situation in the most efficient and amazing way that anyone can imagine.”

A recent example of a disaster area caused by a natural hazard is Hurricane Sandy which hit October 27, 2012. It was the most devastating storm in decades hitting the United States. The storm killed about 50 people and many were also hit by falling trees. The hardest-hit state was New York, leaving millions without power and a few homeless.

A disaster area caused by a sociological hazard would be the terrorist attack on September 11th, 2001, in New York City. Two airplanes struck the Twin Towers, causing them to crumble, killing many people in the process. The unexpected attack harmed many people and had a detrimental impact on New York City.

Melbourne, Australia was declared a disaster area by the Victorian Premier on August 2nd 2020 after the region had a drastic uprise in COVID-19 cases that could not be traced to the source of the infection.

On August 5th 2020, Lebanon's military council declared Beirut a disaster area after a powerful explosion in the seaport.

See also
Disaster
Emergency management
State of emergency

External links
 Federal Disaster Area Declarations
 Frequency of Disaster Declarations by U.S. County (map)
FEMA Disaster Declarations Summary - Open Government Dataset

References

Disasters
Area